The Clásica de Almería is a single-day road bicycle race held annually in February or March in Almería, Spain, starting and finishing in Almería itself. Established in 1986, the race was run as an amateur event in its first six years. In 1992, it became fully professional. From 2005, the race was organised as a 1.1 event on the UCI Europe Tour, and became part of the new UCI ProSeries in 2020 as a 1.Pro event.

Winners

Notes

References

External links
Official site 

 
UCI Europe Tour races
Recurring sporting events established in 1986
1986 establishments in Spain
Cycle races in Spain
Sport in Andalusia